Zhang Jie (born 20 December 1982 in Chengdu, Sichuan), also known as Jason Zhang, is a Chinese pop singer. He made his television series debut in the reality singing competition My Show in 2004, which he won.

By the end of May 2017, Zhang had recorded 12 albums and held 34 concerts. He has won the Most Popular Male Singer Award 33 times and Best Male Singer 12 times.

Biography

1982–2003: Early life

Zhang was born on the 20th of December, 1982, in Chengdu, Sichuan.

In 2000, he studied at Sichuan Normal University.

In 2003, he took part in the MTV-Samsung Anycall National Singing Competition and won second place.

2004–2006: Shang Teng Universal
In 2004, Zhang took part in the first season of My Show. After progressing through stages of strict selection, he won the annual championship in the finals, with the original song "Love of the Plough", composed with GOU Wei. Then he signed with Shang Teng Universal.

In 2005, Zhang released his debut album, The First Album. This earned him numerous newcomer awards, such as the Global Chinese Music Chart Most Popular Male Newcomer award.

In 2006, after the release of his second album, Love Me Again, Zhang's music career was at stake due to changes at the top management of his record company.

2007–2015: EE-Media

In 2007, he took part in Hunan TV's show Super Boy and won 4th place. Zhang, the third runner-up of the show, signed a deal with EE-Media and released an EP, The Most Beautiful Sun, in the same year, which marked a fresh restart of his career.

In May 2008, Zhang held his first concert in Beijing at Beijing Exhibition Center. In July, he held a concert at Hangzhou Gymnasium.

In October, he released the album The Day After Tomorrow. With its positive performance on the music charts, he won his first "Most Popular Male Singer (Mainland)" award.

In 2009, for the album The Day After Tomorrow, Zhang gained 11 nominations in Beijing pop music ceremony and became the favorite figure. In November, he released the album Through Trilogy. On December 19, he held a theme concert for Through Trilogy at Beijing Workers' Gymnasium.

In April 2010, Zhang attended the Boao Forum for Asia as an invited guest to perform two songs of Michael Jackson: "Billie Jean" and "Beat it". In June, he sang the theme song for the film Triple Tap. In November, he released his 6th album, It's Love. In November, he held a theme concert as It's Love at Beijing Workers' Gymnasium. On November 28, he won the "Best Asian Artist" award in the Mnet Asian Music Awards. In December, he was invited as the only male singer from mainland China to the TVB Golden Melody Awards Ceremony in Hong Kong, and received an award for top ten golden songs of the year and Most Popular Male Singer (Mainland).

In 2011, Zhang released the album Stand Up. In December, he held the theme concert It's Love in his hometown Chengdu.

On March 1, 2012, as an invited guest, Zhang performed in a collaborative staging of the song "My Love" at the concert of Westlife. He started his new touring concerts at the Great Hall of the People in Beijing on 5 May and Shanghai Grand Stage on June 30 respectively. On September 29, he released an album called One Chance, and on November 19 he released a cover album called Love That We Once Encountered. Also in this year, he set up his own studio: Zhang Jie Studio.

In February 2013, for the first time, he was invited to perform the song "Give Me Your Love" with Yoga at the CCTV Spring Festival Gala. In June, he went to Berklee College of Music for further studies. In September, he was invited to the China Tennis Open with famous tennis players Li Na and Novak Djokovic to promote public welfare work. In November, Zhang released his 10th album, Just Love, and held his 10th concert in Guangzhou.

In January 2014, Zhang joined Season 2 of Hunan Television's I Am a Singer. From September to December, he held his first live tour, Fight Back For Love, which generated a positive response. In August, he was invited to perform the theme song, "Light the Future", at the Opening Ceremony of the Nanjing Youth Olympics 2014. In November, he was presented with the International Artist Award at the 2014 American Music Awards, as the first Chinese singer to win this award. In this year, he sang several songs for Chinese operas, and "Heart of Sword" for the opera Swords Of Legends was a hit.

In April 2015, he released his collection with Xiaomi. He also participated in various talent shows, including some adventure shows, music shows and reality shows. In May, Zhang ended his eight-year contract with EE-Media, and made his own independent studio. He won awards from several music shows this year. He also sang for the opera The Lost Tomb and the film Monk Comes Down the Mountain, directed by Kaige Chen.

2016–present: Planet Culture

On February 7, 2016, Zhang sang the song "Shining Era" at the CCTV Spring Festival Gala. On February 21, the Just For Star concert was held in United Artists Theater, Los Angeles. Zhang took charge of the concert and invited David Foster and violinist Lindsey Stirling to perform together.

On April 26, Zhang set up his personal label, Planet Culture, and cooperated with Linfair Records.

On July 16, Zhang began his first world tour at Beijing Worker's Stadium.

On July 21, 2016, he performed Star Trek Beyonds Chinese theme song "Lost in the Stars", and attended the film's premiere at Embarcadero Marina Park South. He recorded the promotional song "Give You My World" for the film Allied in November.

From July to December, Zhang's tour travelled to Beijing, Nanjing, Guangzhou, Shanghai, Chengdu, Xi'an, Wuhan, Hefei, Dalian, and Kunming. With each city he visited, the concerts were sold out.

In February 2017, Zhang joined Hunan Television's Singer 2017 as the first previous season contestant to join the competition this season. In May and June, he brought his world tour in the US, Canada, Malaysia and Australia. On May 7, he held his concert in Dolby Theatre, as the first mainland singer singing in the Dolby Theatre. On May 14, he sang in the Queen Elizabeth Theatre, Vancouver. On May 21, Zhang came to David Geffen Hall, Lincoln Center. On June 10, he performed in Kuala Lumpur and June 18 in Sydney.

In June, Zhang sang China's theme song, "Torches", for Transformers: The Last Knight.

In 2020, He ranked 86th on Forbes China Celebrity 100 list.

Discography

 The First Album (2005-03-18)
 Love Me Again (2006-09-20)
 Most Beautiful Sun (2007-12-24)
 The Day After Tomorrow (2008-08-27)
 Through Trilogy (2009-11-01)
 It's Love (2010-11-21)
 Stand Up (2011-11-03)
 One Chance (2012-09-29)
 The Love Songs We Once Encountered (2012-11-26)
 Just Love (2013-12-20)
 Ten (2015-04-15)
 Sound of My Heart (2016-08-12)
 Love, and Courage (2016-08-20)
 Future Live (2018-05-20)
 Songs of youth (2020-07-23)

Concerts

Headlining act 
 Begin With Star (2008)
It's Love (2010-2013)
Fight Back The Love (2014)
Sound Of My Heart (2016-2017)
Future Live (2018-)

Variety shows 
Zhang participated in Hunan Television's long-running singing reality competition I Am a Singer, and made it to the finals on both attempts.

I Am a Singer
Zhang debuted on Week three as a substitute singer as a replacement of the first eliminated singer Gary Chaw. He made it to the finals, but did not finish in the top two to qualify for the "Ultimate Winner Candidate" (the candidates were G.E.M. and Han Lei, with the latter winning the season).

Singer 2017 
In February 2017, Zhang later returned again in the fifth season as the one of four returning singers to participate in the competition. He finished in eighth place after narrowly avoiding eliminations on six of 11 performances. Unlike his first season appearance, Zhang was not selected to participate in the Biennial Concert.

Awards and achievements

Personal life
On May 5, 2011, Zhang and Xie Na registered their marriage in Chengdu, China. On September 26, 2011, they married at Shangri-La, China. On September 26, 2017,  Zhang revealed on his Weibo that his wife was expecting a baby. On February 1, 2018, they welcomed twin daughters.

Published works

References

 American Music Awards 2014: Chinese popstars Jason Zhang, Chopstick Brothers among big winners, Los Angeles Daily News
 Zhang Jie accepts int'l artist of year award in LA, Chinadaily

External links
 Youtube

Singers from Chengdu
Super Boy contestants
1982 births
Living people